There are two known parathyroid hormone receptors in mammals termed PTH1R and PTH2R. These receptors bind parathyroid hormone and are members of the  GPCR family of transmembrane proteins.

 parathyroid hormone 1 receptor (PTH1R) is the classical PTH receptor, is expressed in high levels in bone and kidney and regulates calcium ion homeostasis through activation of adenylate cyclase and phospholipase C.
 parathyroid hormone 2 receptor (PTH2R) is expressed primarily in the central nervous system, pancreas, testis, and placenta.

References

External links
 

G protein-coupled receptors